Mike von Joel is a publisher, editor and writer.

He has worked in publishing for over 40 years and is currently editor-in-chief at State Media and StateF22 magazine. Founded in January 2011, StateF22 is a not-for-profit free bi-monthly glossy magazine about art and photography, distributed throughout the UK via art galleries and arts venues.

Von Joel is also Creative Director of Art Bermondsey Project Space, a not-for-profit contemporary art gallery in Bermondsey, London.

Both these roles are pro bono.

Early life 
Von Joel was born and raised in Scarborough, North Yorkshire. He is a graduate of Winchester College of Art. His former wife is Chrissie Shrimpton with whom he has four children.

Since 2014 he has been married to former fashion editor and interior designer, Mary Weaver.

Career
Von Joel's former publications include The New Style which ran from 1976 to 1980; Art Line, founded in 1982 which ran for 15 years; Artissues, founded in 1990; artBooknews, also founded in 1990; as well as State of Art, a free newspaper published in partnership with Matthew Flowers from 2005 to 2007; and as editor of Norway based Photoicon which focussed on international photography.

References

External links
State Media/F22

Living people
Year of birth missing (living people)
People from Scarborough, North Yorkshire
British publishers (people)
British journalists
Alumni of the University of Southampton